Adenosma is a genus of flowering plants belonging to the family Plantaginaceae.

Its native range is Tropical and Subtropical Asia to Northern Australia.

Species:

Adenosma annamensis 
Adenosma bracteosa 
Adenosma camphorata 
Adenosma cordifolia 
Adenosma debilis 
Adenosma elsholtzioides 
Adenosma glutinosa 
Adenosma hirsuta 
Adenosma indiana 
Adenosma inopinata 
Adenosma javanica 
Adenosma macrophylla 
Adenosma malabarica 
Adenosma microcephala 
Adenosma muelleri 
Adenosma nelsonioides 
Adenosma papuana 
Adenosma punctata 
Adenosma retusiloba 
Adenosma subrepens 
Adenosma ternata 
Adenosma thorelii

References

Plantaginaceae
Plantaginaceae genera